Suspect Device is a 1995 American film directed by Rick Jacobson and starring C. Thomas Howell. It was the first film of the Roger Corman Presents series.

Premise
A man discovers that he really is a cyborg carrying a nuclear device set to explode, and therefore marked for erasure.

Cast
C. Thomas Howell as Dan Jericho
Stacey Travis as Dr. Jessica Parker
Jed Allan as Artemus Lockwood
John Beck as CIA Director

References

External links
Review of film at Variety

1996 films
Films produced by Roger Corman
1990s science fiction films
1990s English-language films
Films directed by Rick Jacobson
American science fiction action films
1990s American films